The 2018 South American Under-20 Futsal Championship  is the 8th edition of the South American Under-20 Futsal Championship, the biennial international youth futsal championship organised by the CONMEBOL for the men's under-20 national teams of South America. The tournament is held in Lima, Peru between 4–11 November 2018.

Teams
All ten CONMEBOL member national teams entered the tournament.

 (title holders)

 (hosts)

Venues
All matches are played in one venue: Complejo Deportivo de la Federación Peruana de Fútbol in Lima.

Draw
The draw of the tournament was held on 26 October 2018, 12:00 PET (UTC−5), at the headquarters of the Peruvian Football Federation. The ten teams were drawn into two groups of five teams. The defending champions Argentina and the hosts Peru were seeded into Groups A and B respectively, while the remaining teams were placed into four "pairing pots" according to their results in the 2016 South American Under-20 Futsal Championship: Brazil–Venezuela, Uruguay–Paraguay, Chile–Colombia, Bolivia–Ecuador.

Group stage
All times are local, PET (UTC−5).

Group A

Group B

Knockout stage

Bracket

Semi-finals

Ninth place play-off

Seventh place play-off

Fifth place play-off

Third place play-off

Final

Final ranking

References

External links
Sudamericano Sub20 Futsal Perú 2018, FPF.org.pe

2018 Under-20
2018 in South American futsal
2018 in Peruvian football
November 2018 sports events in South America
2018 South American Under-20 Futsal Championship